Katie Louise Volding (born February 13, 1989) is a former American actress. In 2000, she was nominated for a Young Artist Award in the category "Best Performance in a TV Movie or Pilot" for her performance in the Disney Channel Original Movie Smart House.

Acting career 
In 1997, she appeared in the ABC sitcom Teen Angel. She has a main role in the television films Au Pair (1999), Au Pair II (2001), and Au Pair 3: Adventure in Paradise (2009). 
Katie also plays Brink's little sister in the Disney Channel original movie, Brink!
In her earlier years, she made a small appearance as Uh-Huh's girlfriend at the end of the film Little Rascals.

Filmography

References

External links
 

1989 births
20th-century American actresses
21st-century American actresses
American child actresses
American film actresses
American television actresses
Living people
Actresses from Santa Monica, California